The Secret Fury is a 1950 American psychological thriller film noir directed by Mel Ferrer and starring Claudette Colbert, Robert Ryan and Jane Cowl.

Plot
A wealthy classical pianist, Ellen, is accused of already being married when she attempts to take her wedding vows; the wedding guests are shocked. They temporarily call off the wedding and the couple tries to investigate why someone would accuse her of already being married.

With the help of a lawyer and the district attorney, the couple tracks down and questions the justice of the peace that signed her wedding papers. Even he recognizes her as the woman he married. Frustrated, the couple next visits the man to whom Ellen is accused of being married. In a back room a gunshot fires and Ellen is accused of killing the man. She breaks down after a lengthy trial, is eventually found not guilty due to insanity, and is sent to a mental institution. Meanwhile, her fiance David, still believing her innocence, begins to find clues that may help free her.

Cast
 Claudette Colbert as Ellen R. Ewing
 Robert Ryan as David McLean
 Jane Cowl as Aunt Clara Ewing
 Paul Kelly as District Attorney Eric Lowell
 Philip Ober as Gregory Kent
 Elisabeth Risdon as Dr. Twining
 Doris Dudley as Pearl Collins
 Dave Barbour as Lucian Randall
 Vivian Vance as Leah, the hotel maid
 José Ferrer as José (uncredited)
 Kathleen Freeman as Jury Member (uncredited)

Reception
Bosley Crowther lambasted the film, especially the screenplay, writing, "Things must be tough in the picture business when such a respectable cast as is in The Secret Fury, now on the Paramount's screen, descends to such cheap and lurid twaddle as this R.K.O. melodrama is, Claudette Colbert, Robert Ryan, Paul Kelly, Philip Ober, Jane Cowl and even José Ferrer in a 'bit' role are the major performers who expend more physical energy than intelligence on this wantonly unintelligible tale.... To lay any blame on the performers for the nonsense that takes place on the screen would be an obvious injustice."

References

External links
 
 
 
 
 

1950 films
1950s mystery thriller films
1950s psychological thriller films
American black-and-white films
American mystery thriller films
American psychological thriller films
Film noir
Films scored by Roy Webb
Films directed by Mel Ferrer
RKO Pictures films
1950s English-language films
1950s American films